Kearsney College is a private boarding, English medium high school for boys in Botha's Hill, a small town between the provincial capital of Pietermaritzburg and Durban, in the KwaZulu-Natal province of South Africa.

History 

Kearsney College was founded by Sir Liege Hulett in 1921. Hulett founded what would become Tongaat Hulett Sugar. Sir Liege Hulett cherished the idea of establishing a boys' school for Methodist ministers and their sons and those of the families of the free churches. Kearsney took its name from Kearsney, Kent where Sir Liege Hulett had moved to where his father established St Martin's Academy.

He considered Kearsney House, the house he originally built for his family to be ideally suited for this purpose. On 29 November 1920, a contract was signed with the Wesleyan Church for the use of Kearsney House as a school. This was the birth of Kearsney College and remains a living memorial to Sir Liege. The school opened with 11 boys. Kearsney College remained at the Kearsney Estate until June 1939 when it moved to its present site at Botha's Hill between Pietermaritzburg and Durban. The decision to move the school was based on the reluctance of parents to send their sons to a school on the north coast that suffered many cases of malaria in the 1930s, although none were reported at Kearsney.  On hearing of this, Clement Stott of Botha’s Hill donated  of land. At the same time, J.J. Crookes offered to build a boarding house. The move was completed a month before the beginning of World War II. The new Kearsney College opened with 196 boys.

Kearsney's badge was designed by the then-headmaster, R.H. Matterson, and the chaplain, the Rev. W.H. Irving, in about 1923. The greyhound is taken from the arms of the founder, Sir James Liege Hulett The scallop shells and the dividing chevron are from the arms of the founder of Methodism, John Wesley. The pheon, or arrowhead, is taken from the badge of Sidney Sussex College, Cambridge, where Matterson studied. The motto Carpe Diem, traditionally at Kearsney translated "Seize the Day," comes from the Roman poet Horace.

Headmasters 
 D. Pyne Mercier (1921–1922)
 R.H. Matterson (1923–1946)
 S.G. Osler (1947–1964)
 J.H. Hopkins (1965–1974)
 E.W. Silcock (1975–1990)
 O.J. Roberts (1991–2000)
 E.D. van den Aardweg (2001 -2022)

Boarding Houses 

There are five boarding establishments - four senior houses and one junior house. They are Finningley (blue), Gillingham (red), Pembroke (green), Sheffield (yellow) and Haley (house for student's first year of boarding). Finningley is named after the town of Finningley in South Yorkshire, England. Gillingham is named after Gillingham, Kent, England Where Sir Liege Hulett lived as a young man Pembroke is named after the town of Pembroke, Pembrokeshire, Wales. Sheffield is named after Sheffield in South Yorkshire, England where Sir Liege Hulett moved to following his time in Gillingham.

Academics 
The School offers the following subject choices for Grades 10,11,12 : English; Afrikaans or isiZulu; Mathematics or Mathematical Literacy; Life Orientation; Accounting, Business Studies, Dramatic Art; Engineering Graphics and Design; Geography; History; Information Technology; Life Sciences (Biology); Music; Science; Mandarin and Visual Arts.

In 2020, Kearsney had a 100% pass rate and a 100% Bachelor Degree pass rate.

Clubs and Cultural Activities 
Clubs offered range from academic extension (12 Club; History Club) to personal enrichment (SCA; Dale Carnegie Course; Chess) to creative (Photographic Club; Video Editing Club; Enviro Club) to the physical (Surfing; Survival Club; Mountain Bike Club) and to the just plain fun (Board Games Club). Finally, boys are coached in the skills of public speaking through their membership of the Speakers’ Circle and Inner Circle Speakers’ Club.

Sports 

Sports facilities include several rugby fields, several cricket ovals, an artificial turf for field hockey and two swimming pools. Included is the SportZone, an indoor training facility that holds several cricket nets, two indoor and two outdoor basketball courts, and a gymnasium.

Sports on offer at the College include:
 Basketball 
 Canoeing
 Cricket
 Cross country 
 Golf
 Hockey
 Indoor hockey
 Rugby
 Rugby sevens
 Soccer
 Squash
 Swimming
 Tennis
 Water polo

Kearsney has been the host of the Kearsney Easter Rugby Festival since 2008. This school's rugby tournament regularly attracts top South African schools teams. Previous festival players that have achieved higher honours include : Handré Pollard, Warrick Gelant, Jan Serfontein, RG Snyman, Dan du Preez, Jean-Luc du Preez, JJ van der Mescht, [James Hall]

Exchange Programme 

Kearsney has an international exchange programme with several schools. Schools that Kearsney pupils spend time at include: Catholic University School in Dublin, Ireland, Mount St Mary’s College, Derbyshire, England, Rossall School in Rossall and Canberra Grammar School in Red Hill, Australia.

Notable alumni

Authors
Douglas Livingstone (poet) (1949)

Politicians
Tony Leon (1974) - founder of South Africa's Democratic Alliance

Businessmen

 Luke Bailes - Owner of Singita Game Reserve
 David Polkinghorne – CEO of Grindrod Bank
 Nick Sloane (salvage expert) - Salvage master for Costa Concordia
 Gordon Schachat - Property, private equity and investment banking
 A.B. Theunissen - CEO of VW South Africa and of Total Oil SA.

Medical

 Henry Markram - Founder and Director of the Blue Brain Project.
 Jonathan Pons (1980) - ophthalmologist
 Dr Michael A. Belfort - World’s First Use of Thulium Laser-Assisted Fetal Cardiac Surgery
 Professor Nigel Clement Halley Stott - professor of general practice in the Cardiff Medical School, awarded a CBE for services to primary care and general practice medicine

Other
Ian McGregor (1952) - director of the Smithsonian
Terence Reis - Guitarist Dire Straits
Professor David Hall - United Nations advisor, Leader in alternative energy
Alan Dell - BBC radio broadcaster
Kendrew Lascelles - actor, performer and writer
HRH Prince Shlobosenkosi Zulu of the Zulu royal family
King Ndamase Ndamase sixth King of Western Pondoland

Sports

Cricket
Andrew Hudson (1982) - South African national team cricket player
Kyle Abbott - South African national team cricket player and best first-class figures in more than 60 years
David Polkinghorne – first-class cricketer

Hockey
Jonathan Lowe 1968 - South African Hockey
Paul Logan 1985 - South African Hockey
Greg Pilling 1992 - South African Hockey
Justin King 1995 - South African Hockey
Greg Last 2013 - South African Hockey
Wayne Madsen 2004 - South African Hockey
Lloyd Madsen 2007 - South African Hockey
Nqobile Ntuli 2017 - South African Hockey
Siphesihle 'Sihle' Ntuli, South Africa 2020 Summer Olympics he assistant coached the South Africa men's national field hockey team and coach South Africa men Junior World Cup

Rugby
Harry Newton-Walker (1945) - Springbok rugby player - Cap 311
Mike Halliday - USA rugby player
Giovanni 'John' Antoni Italy Rugby
Francois Viljoen - USA rugby player
Ayron Schramm - Germany Rugby
Trevor Halstead (1994) - Springbok rugby player - Cap 720
Etienne Fynn (2001) - Springbok rugby player - Cap 710
Matt Stevens (2001) - England and British & Irish Lions rugby player
Brad Barritt (2004) - England rugby player
Jean-Luc du Preez (2013) - Springbok rugby player - Cap 881 
Dan du Preez (2013) - Springbok rugby player - Cap 889
Robert du Preez (2012) - Springbok rugby player - Cap 904

Other
Myles Brown - Rio Olympic Games – Swimming
Troy Prinsloo

References

External links 

Boys' schools in South Africa
Boarding schools in South Africa
Private schools in KwaZulu-Natal
Educational institutions established in 1921
1921 establishments in South Africa